Flamoke is a surname. Notable people with the surname include:

 Gilbert Flamoke ( 1508–1573), English politician
 John Flamoke (by 1486–1535/41), English politician